Volkswagen Autoeuropa Lda. is an automotive assembly plant, located in the city of Palmela, near Lisbon, Portugal. Formed in 1991, it began operations in 1995 fully owned by Volkswagen. It is the largest foreign industrial investment in Portugal.

History

After the signature of a joint venture agreement between Volkswagen Group and Ford in July 1991, the 2 million m2 plant was built in four years, including a surrounding industrial park on which key suppliers are located. The plant and surrounding industrial park cost in total 1.970 M€.

Opened as a 50/50 joint venture, its initial purpose was to assemble a communal-designed MPV model sold under three marques: Volkswagen Sharan, SEAT Alhambra, and Ford Galaxy. Producing these vehicles, Volkswagen Autoeuropa almost reached its production limit of 172,500 units per year.

However, when Ford left the joint venture and the model life-cycle approached its end, Volkswagen took ownership of the plant and production declined considerably.  Under Volkswagen's internal bidding system, the plant had to compete for new models with other Volkswagen plants, while threatening to close the plant and to give concessions to the workers and the State.

Eventually, AutoEuropa won the production rights of the new convertible/coupé-only Volkswagen Eos from late 2005, producing just 79,896 vehicles of the original models plus the Eos. In 2008 the plant started production of the third generation Volkswagen Scirocco, and presently employs 3,000 people on site, 2,350 supplier jobs on the industrial park, and an additional 3,750 supplier jobs within Portugal.

As the existing models come to the end of their life cycles, the plant will need to compete for new models from 2010 onwards. It was proposed that in 2009 to prepare the production line for the replacement, although the economic crisis will delay that model.

Internal sources said Volkswagen Autoeuropa was to take up production of the Volkswagen Polo by November 2010 at the latest, as a 2011 showroom model, a sub-compact sold everywhere but the US and Canada. The factory management were also bidding for production of the new Volkswagen BlueSport roadster. None of these plans came to fruition.

On July 1, 2013, car number 2,000,000 rolled off the assembly line, a Volkswagen Sharan 2.0 TDI Highline.

In December 2016, the plant won the production rights for the new compact crossover, Volkswagen T-Roc.

In March 2020, SEAT Alhambra is discontinued.

Production

Production by model

Current production 
 Volkswagen T-Roc (Nov, 2017–present)

Former production
Ford Galaxy Mk1 (May, 1995 - Feb, 2006)
SEAT Alhambra Mk1 (1996 - 2010)
Volkswagen Sharan Mk1 (May, 1995 - 2010)
Volkswagen Eos (2006 - Jun, 2015)
Volkswagen Scirocco Mk3 (Jun, 2008 - Oct, 2017)
SEAT Alhambra Mk2 (2010 - 2020)
Volkswagen Sharan Mk2 (2010 - 2022)

References

External links
AutoEuropa plant website

Motor vehicle assembly plants in Portugal
Car manufacturers of Portugal
Volkswagen Group factories